Metcalf Brook flows into West Canada Creek a few miles upstream of Nobleboro in Hamilton County, New York.

References

Rivers of New York (state)
Rivers of Hamilton County, New York